Elvis Rolle (born February 8, 1958) is a Bahamian former professional basketball player.

Rolle played college basketball for the Oral Roberts Golden Eagles for two seasons before he transferred to play for the Florida State Seminoles during his final two years of eligibility, where he was named a second-team All-Metro selection during his senior season. He was selected by the Los Angeles Lakers as the 42nd overall pick of the 1981 NBA draft but did not play in the National Basketball Association (NBA).

Rolle spent the majority of his thirteen-year career in Italy with the exception of one season in France playing for AS Monaco in 1988–89. With Virtus Bologna, Rolle won an Italian championship title and an Italian Cup in 1984.

Career statistics

College

|-
| style="text-align:left;"| 1976–77
| style="text-align:left;"| Oral Roberts
| 26 || – || – || .500 || – || .435 || 2.0 || .3 || – || .4 || 2.3
|-
| style="text-align:left;"| 1977–78
| style="text-align:left;"| Oral Roberts
| 27 || – || – || .428 || – || .694 || 6.4 || .2 || – || .3 || 6.6
|-
| style="text-align:left;"| 1979–80
| style="text-align:left;"| Florida State
| 31 || – || 32.2 || .612 || – || .577 || 7.9 || .8 || .5 || 1.4 || 15.4
|-
| style="text-align:left;"| 1980–81
| style="text-align:left;"| Florida State
| 28 || – || 32.1 || .566 || – || .569 || 9.2 || .4 || .5 || 1.7 || 16.0
|- class="sortbottom"
| style="text-align:center;" colspan="2"| Career
| 112 || – || 32.2 || .553 || – || .583 || 6.5 || .4 || .5 || 1.0 || 10.4

References

External links
College statistics

1958 births
Living people
AS Monaco Basket players
Bahamian expatriate basketball people in France
Bahamian expatriate basketball people in Italy
Bahamian expatriate basketball people in the United States
Bahamian men's basketball players
Centers (basketball)
Florida State Seminoles men's basketball players
Los Angeles Lakers draft picks
Oral Roberts Golden Eagles men's basketball players
Pallacanestro Trapani players
Pallacanestro Virtus Roma players
Power forwards (basketball)
Virtus Bologna players